The following list shows successful field goals by National Basketball Association (NBA) players during a regular season or playoff game, shot from a known distance of at least  from the basket. These attempts are generally buzzer beaters when there is not enough time left on the clock to pass or dribble the ball further upcourt for a closer and easier shot attempt. Baron Davis holds the record for longest NBA field goal; on February 17, 2001, as a member of the Charlotte Hornets, he successfully made an 89-foot shot while visiting the Milwaukee Bucks at the Bradley Center.

See also
 List of Hail Mary passes in American football, shows some of the longest touchdowns in NFL history

References

National Basketball Association lists
National Basketball Association statistical leaders
Basketball statistics